The 1968–69 Phoenix Suns season was the inaugural season for the Phoenix Suns of the National Basketball Association. Head coach Red Kerr led the franchise to its first win in their debut game, over the Seattle SuperSonics. The Suns lost more games in their initial season than in any year since, and did not have a winning record against any other team. They played all their home games in the Arizona Veterans Memorial Coliseum.

Dick Van Arsdale was the franchise's first All-Star selection when he was selected to play in the 1969 All-Star Game. He was the team's second leading scorer at 21 points per game, behind eventual Hall of Fame member Gail Goodrich, who averaged 23.8, the seventh-highest in the league for the season. Goodrich was selected to replace an injured Jerry West in the All-Star Game.

Offseason

NBA Expansion Draft

The Suns participated in the NBA's fourth expansion draft along with the Milwaukee Bucks, the other expansion team that joined the league in 1968. Each of the league's other 12 teams protected seven of their top players, with the remaining unprotected players available in the draft. The two expansion teams selected three players from each team, totaling 18 selections each.

The Suns received the first, fourth and fifth picks, while the Bucks, which had not yet chosen their team name at the time, received the second and third picks. The Suns' first selection was swingman Dick Van Arsdale of the New York Knicks. The Bucks then selected center Wayne Embry of the Boston Celtics, and power forward Fred Hetzel of the San Francisco Warriors. The Suns rounded out the top five by picking point guard Gail Goodrich of the Los Angeles Lakers and shooting guard Dick Snyder of the Atlanta Hawks. "The Original Sun" Dick Van Arsdale would have a historic career with the Suns after being drafted, with him being an All-Star in his first three seasons with the team, as well as be named a member of the All-Defensive Second Team in 1974 and helping the team reach the 1976 NBA Finals before retiring in 1977, having his number become the second in franchise history to be retired into the Phoenix Suns Ring of Honor in the 1977–78 season, behind Connie Hawkins.

NBA Draft

Roster

Regular season

Standings

Record vs. opponents

Game log

!!Streak
|-
|- align="center" bgcolor="#ccffcc"
| 1
| October 18
| Seattle
| W 116–107
| Gail Goodrich (27)
| Arizona Veterans Memorial Coliseum7,112
| 1–0
| W 1
|- align="center" bgcolor="#ffcccc"
| 2
| October 20
| Baltimore
| L 122–134
| Dick Van Arsdale (26)
| Arizona Veterans Memorial Coliseum3,474
| 1–1
| L 1
|- align="center" bgcolor="#ffcccc"
| 3
| October 22
| @ San Francisco
| L 101–109
| Gail Goodrich (29)
| Oakland–Alameda County Coliseum Arena4,291
| 1–2
| L 2
|- align="center" bgcolor="#ccffcc"
| 4
| October 24
| New York
| W 109–92
| Gail Goodrich (31)
| Arizona Veterans Memorial Coliseum3,450
| 2–2
| W 1
|- align="center" bgcolor="#ffcccc"
| 5
| October 27
| Atlanta
| L 100–123
| Gail Goodrich (23)
| Arizona Veterans Memorial Coliseum4,603
| 2–3
| L 1
|- align="center" bgcolor="#ccffcc"
| 6
| October 30
| @ Seattle
| W 115–108
| Gail Goodrich (32)
| Seattle Center Coliseum2,657
| 3–3
| W 1
|- align="center" bgcolor="#ccffcc"
| 7
| October 31
| Chicago
| W 112–103
| Gail Goodrich (30)
| Arizona Veterans Memorial Coliseum3,029
| 4–3
| W 2
|-
!!Streak
|-
|- align="center" bgcolor="#ffcccc"
| 8
| November 3
| Los Angeles
| L 109–127
| Dick Van Arsdale (38)
| Arizona Veterans Memorial Coliseum7,150
| 4–4
| L 1
|- align="center" bgcolor="#ffcccc"
| 9
| November 4
| San Francisco
| L 108–119
| Dick Van Arsdale (29)
| Arizona Veterans Memorial Coliseum3,019
| 4–5
| L 2
|- align="center" bgcolor="#ccffcc"
| 10
| November 10
| Detroit
| W 130–128 (OT)
| George Wilson (33)
| Arizona Veterans Memorial Coliseum4,440
| 5–5
| W 1
|- align="center" bgcolor="#ffcccc"
| 11
| November 14
| Detroit
| L 109–111
| Gail Goodrich (25)
| Tucson, AZ2,712
| 5–6
| L 1
|- align="center" bgcolor="#ffcccc"
| 12
| November 15
| @ Seattle
| L 124–128 (2OT)
| Dick Van Arsdale (34)
| Seattle Center Coliseum4,368
| 5–7
| L 2
|- align="center" bgcolor="#ffcccc"
| 13
| November 17
| Boston
| L 98–130
| Gail Goodrich,Dave Lattin (13)
| Arizona Veterans Memorial Coliseum9,109
| 5–8
| L 3
|- align="center" bgcolor="#ffcccc"
| 14
| November 19
| @ Philadelphia
| L 110–126
| Dick Van Arsdale (29)
| New York City, NY16,664
| 5–9
| L 4
|- align="center" bgcolor="#ffcccc"
| 15
| November 22
| @ Boston
| L 106–133
| McCoy McLemore (18)
| Boston Garden8,224
| 5–10
| L 5
|- align="center" bgcolor="#ffcccc"
| 16
| November 23
| @ Milwaukee
| L 112–115
| McCoy McLemore (28)
| Milwaukee Arena6,090
| 5–11
| L 6
|- align="center" bgcolor="#ffcccc"
| 17
| November 26
| Philadelphia
| L 119–126
| Gail Goodrich (32)
| Arizona Veterans Memorial Coliseum3,209
| 5–12
| L 7
|- align="center" bgcolor="#ffcccc"
| 18
| November 27
| @ Detroit
| L 111–125
| George Wilson (24)
| Cobo Arena11,016
| 5–13
| L 8
|- align="center" bgcolor="#ffcccc"
| 19
| November 29
| @ Baltimore
| L 106–124
| Gail Goodrich,Dick Van Arsdale (24)
| Baltimore Civic Center6,596
| 5–14
| L 9
|- align="center" bgcolor="#ffcccc"
| 20
| November 30
| @ Chicago
| L 96–100
| Dick Van Arsdale (29)
| Chicago Stadium3,246
| 5–15
| L 10
!!Streak
|-
|- align="center" bgcolor="#ffcccc"
| 21
| December 2
| Seattle
| L 108–118
| Gail Goodrich (26)
| Arizona Veterans Memorial Coliseum2,171
| 5–16
| L 11
|- align="center" bgcolor="#ffcccc"
| 22
| December 3
| @ Los Angeles
| L 108–122
| Gail Goodrich (23)
| The Forum8,277
| 5–17
| L 12
|- align="center" bgcolor="#ccffcc"
| 23
| December 4
| San Francisco
| W 126–97
| Gail Goodrich (32)
| Arizona Veterans Memorial Coliseum2,387
| 6–17
| W 1
|- align="center" bgcolor="#ffcccc"
| 24
| December 6
| @ San Diego
| L 106–117
| Dick Van Arsdale (33)
| San Diego Sports Arena5,782
| 6–18
| L 1
|- align="center" bgcolor="#ffcccc"
| 25
| December 8
| Atlanta
| L 99–121
| Dick Van Arsdale (17)
| Arizona Veterans Memorial Coliseum3,243
| 6–19
| L 2
|- align="center" bgcolor="#ffcccc"
| 26
| December 10
| @ New York
| L 106–111
| Gail Goodrich (29)
| Madison Square Garden16,337
| 6–20
| L 3
|- align="center" bgcolor="#ffcccc"
| 27
| December 11
| @ Philadelphia
| L 123–143
| Gail Goodrich (19)
| The Spectrum6,780
| 6–21
| L 4
|- align="center" bgcolor="#ffcccc"
| 28
| December 13
| @ Cincinnati
| L 123–130 (OT)
| Dick Van Arsdale (31)
| Cleveland, OH2,114
| 6–22
| L 5
|- align="center" bgcolor="#ccffcc"
| 29
| December 14
| @ Detroit
| W 123–118
| Gail Goodrich (41)
| Cobo Arena5,024
| 7–22
| W 1
|- align="center" bgcolor="#ffcccc"
| 30
| December 15
| @ Cincinnati
| L 101–119
| Stan McKenzie (28)
| Omaha, NE5,886
| 7–23
| L 1
|- align="center" bgcolor="#ffcccc"
| 31
| December 17
| Philadelphia
| L 128–145
| Dick Snyder (25)
| Arizona Veterans Memorial Coliseum1,946
| 7–24
| L 2
|- align="center" bgcolor="#ccffcc"
| 32
| December 18
| Cincinnati
| W 123–114
| Gail Goodrich (34)
| Arizona Veterans Memorial Coliseum3,462
| 8–24
| W 1
|- align="center" bgcolor="#ffcccc"
| 33
| December 21
| @ Baltimore
| L 117–131
| Gail Goodrich (28)
| Baltimore Civic Center8,529
| 8–25
| L 1
|- align="center" bgcolor="#ffcccc"
| 34
| December 22
| @ Milwaukee
| L 116–127
| Dick Van Arsdale (26)
| Milwaukee Arena3,466
| 8–26
| L 2
|- align="center" bgcolor="#ffcccc"
| 35
| December 25
| Los Angeles
| L 99–119
| Dick Van Arsdale (27)
| Arizona Veterans Memorial Coliseum10,355
| 8–27
| L 3
|- align="center" bgcolor="#ffcccc"
| 36
| December 26
| @ San Francisco
| L 118–119
| Gail Goodrich (40)
| Oakland–Alameda County Coliseum Arena4,916
| 8–28
| L 4
|- align="center" bgcolor="#ffcccc"
| 37
| December 28
| San Diego
| L 126–136
| Gail Goodrich (29)
| Arizona Veterans Memorial Coliseum5,749
| 8–29
| L 5
|- align="center" bgcolor="#ffcccc"
| 38
| December 30
| @ Seattle
| L 118–120
| Jim Fox (24)
| Seattle Center Coliseum3,920
| 8–30
| L 6
|-
!!Streak
|-
|- align="center" bgcolor="#ffcccc"
| 39
| January 1
| Boston
| L 87–93
| Dick Van Arsdale (22)
| Arizona Veterans Memorial Coliseum4,757
| 8–31
| L 7
|- align="center" bgcolor="#ffcccc"
| 40
| January 3
| @ Milwaukee
| L 104–121
| Dick Snyder (22)
| Milwaukee Arena4,230
| 8–32
| L 8
|- align="center" bgcolor="#ffcccc"
| 41
| January 4
| @ Chicago
| L 92–103
| Jim Fox (27)
| Chicago Stadium3,107
| 8–33
| L 9
|- align="center" bgcolor="#ffcccc"
| 42
| January 5
| @ Atlanta
| L 96–97
| Dick Snyder,Dick Van Arsdale (22)
| Alexander Memorial Coliseum3,235
| 8–34
| L 10
|- align="center" bgcolor="#ccffcc"
| 43
| January 7
| Seattle
| W 116–112
| Gail Goodrich (35)
| Arizona Veterans Memorial Coliseum2,875
| 9–34
| W 1
|- align="center" bgcolor="#ffcccc"
| 44
| January 9
| New York
| L 120–134
| Stan McKenzie (18)
| Arizona Veterans Memorial Coliseum2,591
| 9–35
| L 1
|- align="center" bgcolor="#ffcccc"
| 45
| January 11
| Baltimore
| L 107–118
| Gary Gregor (19)
| Arizona Veterans Memorial Coliseum3,807
| 9–36
| L 2
|- align="center"
|colspan="9" bgcolor="#bbcaff"|All-Star Break
|- align="center" bgcolor="#ffcccc"
| 46
| January 16
| @ Atlanta
| L 107–112
| Gary Gregor (26)
| Columbia, SC5,815
| 9–37
| L 3
|- align="center" bgcolor="#ffcccc"
| 47
| January 17
| @ Atlanta
| L 107–112
| Gail Goodrich (27)
| Alexander Memorial Coliseum4,565
| 9–38
| L 4
|- align="center" bgcolor="#ffcccc"
| 48
| January 19
| San Diego
| L 118–136
| Gail Goodrich (29)
| San Diego Sports Arena2,867
| 9–39
| L 5
|- align="center" bgcolor="#ffcccc"
| 49
| January 22
| Atlanta
| L 107–125
| Bob Warlick (23)
| Arizona Veterans Memorial Coliseum2,527
| 9–40
| L 6
|- align="center" bgcolor="#ccffcc"
| 50
| January 24
| Chicago
| W 117–106
| Dick Van Arsdale (27)
| Arizona Veterans Memorial Coliseum6,275
| 10–40
| W 1
|- align="center" bgcolor="#ffcccc"
| 51
| January 25
| @ San Diego
| L 120–133
| Jim Fox,Gail Goodrich (22)
| San Diego Sports Arena4,128
| 10–41
| L 1
|- align="center" bgcolor="#ffcccc"
| 52
| January 26
| San Francisco
| L 93–117
| Neil Johnson (22)
| Arizona Veterans Memorial Coliseum2,452
| 10–42
| L 2
|- align="center" bgcolor="#ccffcc"
| 53
| January 29
| Milwaukee
| W 111–107
| Gail Goodrich (33)
| Tacoma, WA3,013
| 11–42
| W 1
|-
!!Streak
|-
|- align="center" bgcolor="#ccffcc"
| 54
| February 2
| Milwaukee
| W 122–121
| Gail Goodrich (37)
| Arizona Veterans Memorial Coliseum2,926
| 12–42
| W 2
|- align="center" bgcolor="#ccffcc"
| 55
| February 4
| Philadelphia
| W 125–116
| Jim Fox,Dick Van Arsdale (25)
| Arizona Veterans Memorial Coliseum3,317
| 13–42
| W 3
|- align="center" bgcolor="#ffcccc"
| 56
| February 6
| Cincinnati
| L 103–124
| Gail Goodrich (35)
| Tucson, AZ3,849
| 13–43
| L 1
|- align="center" bgcolor="#ffcccc"
| 57
| February 7
| @ San Diego
| L 119–130
| Gail Goodrich (33)
| San Diego Sports Arena6,214
| 13–44
| L 2
|- align="center" bgcolor="#ffcccc"
| 58
| February 8
| Los Angeles
| L 104–122
| Gail Goodrich (29)
| Arizona Veterans Memorial Coliseum9,106
| 13–45
| L 3
|- align="center" bgcolor="#ffcccc"
| 59
| February 9
| @ Los Angeles
| L 116–134
| Gail Goodrich (29)
| The Forum8,840
| 13–46
| L 4
|- align="center" bgcolor="#ffcccc"
| 60
| February 12
| @ New York
| L 105–112
| Gail Goodrich (26)
| Madison Square Garden12,017
| 13–47
| L 5
|- align="center" bgcolor="#ffcccc"
| 61
| February 14
| @ Detroit
| L 123–128
| Jim Fox (24)
| Cobo Arena2,853
| 13–48
| L 6
|- align="center" bgcolor="#ccffcc"
| 62
| February 16
| @ Cincinnati
| W 125–113
| Gail Goodrich (25)
| Cincinnati Gardens3,922
| 14–48
| W 1
|- align="center" bgcolor="#ffcccc"
| 63
| February 18
| @ Boston
| L 110–116
| Gail Goodrich (29)
| Boston Garden7,022
| 14–49
| L 1
|- align="center" bgcolor="#ffcccc"
| 64
| February 20
| @ Baltimore
| L 121–124
| Dick Van Arsdale (44)
| Detroit, MI7,066
| 14–50
| L 2
|- align="center" bgcolor="#ffcccc"
| 65
| February 21
| Chicago
| L 121–133
| Gail Goodrich (43)
| Arizona Veterans Memorial Coliseum4,939
| 14–51
| L 3
|- align="center" bgcolor="#ffcccc"
| 66
| February 22
| Boston
| L 100–124
| Dick Van Arsdale (21)
| Arizona Veterans Memorial Coliseum8,295
| 14–52
| L 4
|- align="center" bgcolor="#ffcccc"
| 67
| February 23
| @ Milwaukee
| L 103–107
| Gail Goodrich (29)
| Green Bay, WI4,347
| 14–53
| L 5
|- align="center" bgcolor="#ffcccc"
| 68
| February 25
| @ Boston
| L 99–112
| Dick Van Arsdale (22)
| New York City, NY19,500
| 14–54
| L 6
|- align="center" bgcolor="#ffcccc"
| 69
| February 26
| @ Philadelphia
| L 97–104
| Dick Van Arsdale (22)
| The Spectrum7,781
| 14–55
| L 7
|- align="center" bgcolor="#ffcccc"
| 70
| February 28
| @ Los Angeles
| L 117–121
| Gail Goodrich (43)
| The Forum15,728
| 14–56
| L 8
|-
!!Streak
|-
|- align="center" bgcolor="#ccffcc"
| 71
| March 1
| @ San Francisco
| W 119–118
| Gail Goodrich (33)
| Oakland–Alameda County Coliseum Arena3,580
| 15–56
| W 1
|- align="center" bgcolor="#ffcccc"
| 72
| March 4
| Cincinnati
| L 122–141
| Gail Goodrich (37)
| Arizona Veterans Memorial Coliseum3,165
| 15–57
| L 1
|- align="center" bgcolor="#ffcccc"
| 73
| March 6
| @ Chicago
| L 117–125 (OT)
| Gail Goodrich (33)
| Carbondale, IL3,125
| 15–58
| L 2
|- align="center" bgcolor="#ffcccc"
| 74
| March 7
| @ New York
| L 87–119
| Bob Warlick (18)
| Philadelphia, PA15,244
| 15–59
| L 3
|- align="center" bgcolor="#ccffcc"
| 75
| March 9
| San Diego
| W 146–133
| Gail Goodrich (47)
| Arizona Veterans Memorial Coliseum2,384
| 16–59
| W 1
|- align="center" bgcolor="#ffcccc"
| 76
| March 10
| Baltimore
| L 121–140
| Dick Van Arsdale (37)
| Arizona Veterans Memorial Coliseum4,133
| 16–60
| L 1
|- align="center" bgcolor="#ffcccc"
| 77
| March 11
| @ San Diego
| L 106–116
| Dick Van Arsdale (26)
| San Diego Sports Arena4,172
| 16–61
| L 2
|- align="center" bgcolor="#ffcccc"
| 78
| March 15
| San Diego
| L 124–141
| Gail Goodrich (38)
| Tucson, AZ2,616
| 16–62
| L 3
|- align="center" bgcolor="#ffcccc"
| 79
| March 17
| Detroit
| L 95–119
| Stan McKenzie (18)
| Arizona Veterans Memorial Coliseum3,128
| 16–63
| L 4
|- align="center" bgcolor="#ffcccc"
| 80
| March 19
| Milwaukee
| L 110–117
| Dick Van Arsdale (32)
| Arizona Veterans Memorial Coliseum3,033
| 16–64
| L 5
|- align="center" bgcolor="#ffcccc"
| 81
| March 21
| New York
| L 104–139
| Gary Gregor (23)
| Arizona Veterans Memorial Coliseum7,175
| 16–65
| L 6
|- align="center" bgcolor="#ffcccc"
| 82
| March 23
| Milwaukee
| L 118–128
| Dick Van Arsdale (31)
| Arizona Veterans Memorial Coliseum3,204
| 16–66
| L 7
|-

Team-by-team results

Awards and honors

All-Star
 Dick Van Arsdale was selected as a reserve for the Western Conference in the All-Star Game. It was his first All-Star selection.
 Gail Goodrich was selected to replace Jerry West in the All-Star Game. It was his first All-Star selection.

Season
 Gary Gregor was named to the NBA All-Rookie First Team.

Player statistics

Season

* – Stats with the Suns.
^ – Minimum 230 field goals.
+ – Minimum 230 free throws.

Transactions

Trades

Free agents

Additions

Subtractions

References

Phoenix
Phoenix Suns seasons